Prince of Jutland, also known as Royal Deceit and Thrones & Empires, is a 1994 drama adventure film co-written and directed by Gabriel Axel and starring Christian Bale, Gabriel Byrne, Helen Mirren, and Kate Beckinsale. It is an adaptation of the Danish legend of prince Amleth, drawing upon the 12th-century works of Saxo Grammaticus, which was also the inspiration for Shakespeare's Hamlet.

The film featured the debut film performances of David Bateson, who later became known for voicing Agent 47 (the protagonist of video game series Hitman), and English actor Andy Serkis.

Cast
 Gabriel Byrne as Fenge
 Helen Mirren as Geruth
 Christian Bale as Amled, son of Hardvendel and Geruth
 Brian Cox as Aethelwine
 Steven Waddington as Ribold
 Kate Beckinsale as Ethel
 Saskia Wickham as Gunvor
 David Bateson as Hother
 Andy Serkis as Torsten
 Tom Wilkinson as Hardvendel, King of Danes
 Freddie Jones as Bjorn
 Tony Haygarth as Ragnar
 Mark Williams as Aslak
 Ewen Bremner as Frovin
 Philip Rham as Aelfred, son of Aethelwine
 Richard Dempsey as Sigurd

See also
 Germanic Heroic Age
 Late Antiquity
 List of historical period drama films

References

External links
 
 
 

Films set in Denmark
1994 films
Amleth
Films based on European myths and legends
Films set in the 7th century
1994 fantasy films
Works based on Gesta Danorum
English-language Danish films
1990s English-language films
Films directed by Gabriel Axel